The 1986 Champ Car season may refer to:
 the 1985–86 USAC Championship Car season, which was just one race, the 70th Indianapolis 500 
 the 1986 CART PPG Indy Car World Series, sanctioned by CART, who would later become Champ Car